Francisley Trueba Bueno (born March 5, 1981) is a Cuban former professional baseball pitcher. He has played in Major League Baseball (MLB) for the Atlanta Braves and Kansas City Royals and in Korea Professional Baseball for the Hanwha Eagles. He is a childhood friend of Yunel Escobar and Brayan Peña, who was also a 2012 player on the Kansas City Royals.

Career

Atlanta Braves
In 17 games for Mississippi, he had a 3.60 earned run average (ERA) and 84 strikeouts. He started  with Mississippi again, but received a late-season promotion to Triple-A Richmond.

After beginning  with Triple-A Richmond, Bueno was called up to the majors on August 3 and made his debut on August 13, during which he nearly hit Alfonso Soriano in the chin, only innings after Soriano show-boated after hitting a long fly ball off Bueno, jumping and celebrating out of the box, only to be left with a single as the ball bounced off the left field wall. Bueno was ejected, along with bench coach Chino Cadahia. A day later, Bueno was given a fine and three-day suspension by Major League Baseball. Bueno will appeal the fine and suspension, and will only have to serve his final sentence once he returns to the Major Leagues. The situation escalated in the final game of the Braves-Cubs series, when Ted Lilly hit Escobar, prompting a shouting match between the two, and the benches and bullpens to clear, but no fight took place, nor ejections made.

Hanwha Eagles
On August 5, Bueno was signed to a deal lasting until the end of the season with Hanwha Eagles of South Korea.

Sultanes de Monterrey
In , Bueno joined the Mexican team Sultanes de Monterrey.

Kansas City Royals
He signed a minor league contract with the Kansas City Royals in 2012 and was assigned to the Omaha Storm Chasers before called up on June 23. He was sent back to the Omaha Storm Chasers on June 27.

Chicago Cubs
On January 17, 2015, Bueno signed a minor league deal with the Chicago Cubs. He was released on April 4.

Tigres de Quintana Roo
On June 11, 2016, Bueno signed with the Tigres de Quintana Roo of the Mexican Baseball League. He was released on March 29, 2017.

Generales de Durango
On May 20, 2017, Bueno signed with the Generales de Durango of the Mexican Baseball League. He re-signed with the team on April 20, 2018. He was released on July 12, 2018.

Bueno throws five pitches — a four-seam and two-seam fastball in the low 90s, a changeup in the mid 80s, a slider in the low 80s, and a curveball in the upper 70s.

See also

List of baseball players who defected from Cuba

References

External links

1981 births
Living people
Major League Baseball pitchers
Atlanta Braves players
Kansas City Royals players
Mississippi Braves players
Richmond Braves players
Hanwha Eagles players
Diablos Rojos del México players
Sultanes de Monterrey players
Omaha Storm Chasers players
Cuban expatriate baseball players in South Korea
Major League Baseball players from Cuba
Cuban expatriate baseball players in the United States
Defecting Cuban baseball players
Baseball players from Havana
Generales de Durango players
Industriales de La Habana players
Águilas Cibaeñas players
Caribes de Anzoátegui players
Cuban expatriate baseball players in Venezuela
Cuban expatriate baseball players in the Dominican Republic
Cuban expatriate baseball players in Mexico
Estrellas Orientales players
Gigantes del Cibao players
Gwinnett Braves players
Indios de Mayagüez players
Cuban expatriate baseball players in Puerto Rico
Tigres de Quintana Roo players
Tigres del Licey players
Yaquis de Obregón players